Fantastic Four: Rise of the Silver Surfer (titled Fantastic 4: Rise of the Silver Surfer on home media) is a 2007 American superhero film, and sequel to the 2005 film Fantastic Four. Both films are based on the Fantastic Four comic book and were directed by Tim Story. The film stars Ioan Gruffudd, Jessica Alba, Chris Evans, and Michael Chiklis as the title characters, with Julian McMahon, Kerry Washington, Andre Braugher, Beau Garrett, Doug Jones and Laurence Fishburne in supporting roles. The plot follows the Fantastic Four (and Doctor Doom) as they confront, and later ally with, the Silver Surfer to save Earth from Galactus.

The film was released on June 15, 2007 in North America. Critical reception was generally mixed but also slightly better than the first film. The film grossed over $301 million worldwide, but earned less than its predecessor which grossed $333.5 million worldwide. A third film was planned but ultimately cancelled, which was attributed to factors such as the film's box office disappointment, the conflict between the director and Jessica Alba, and the producers having trouble finding a new director for a planned Silver Surfer spin-off. As such, the franchise even ended up in development hell. The series was rebooted in 2015 with the release of Fantastic Four to poor critical and commercial reception. Marvel Studios eventually claimed the film rights of the characters, along with the X-Men and Deadpool, after the acquisition of 21st Century Fox by Disney.

Plot
A mysterious, meteor-like object enters Earth's atmosphere, tracing cosmic energy causing fluxes in weather and power outages, and creating mysterious craters. The government approaches Reed Richards to track the movements of the object. Reed and Susan Storm prepare for their wedding amidst huge media hush and publicity. As the wedding begins, Reed's systems detect the phenomenon approaching New York City. 

Johnny Storm pursues the object, finding that it is a silver humanoid on a flying surf board. He confronts the Surfer, but is overpowered. Later, when Susan tries to check Johnny after becoming weakened, their powers switch; when they touch again their powers revert. Reed's examination of Johnny reveals that exposure to the Surfer has set Johnny's molecular structure in passive flux, allowing him to switch powers with his teammates through physical contact.

Tracing the cosmic energy of the Surfer, Reed discovers that a series of planets the Surfer visited previously had all been destroyed. Reed determines that the next crater will appear in London, and the team travels there. They arrive too late to stop the crater, and the Thames drains into it. This also damages the London Eye, but the team manage to save it from collapsing. 

The military has the Four reluctantly work with Victor Von Doom, having been freed from his statue-like state from the Surfer's energy passing over Latveria, and his body healed during an encounter with the Surfer in the Russell Glacier. Deducing that the Surfer's board is the source of his power, Reed develops a pulse generator that will separate him from it. In the Black Forest, Susan is confronted by the Surfer. The military opens fire on the Surfer, which distracts him and allows the four to fire the pulse, separating the Surfer from his board. 

The military imprisons the Surfer in Siberia, while they torture him for information. The four have Susan use her power to privately speak to him. She learns he is serving Galactus, a cosmic entity which feeds on life-bearing planets to survive. His service to Galactus is what prevents his world from being destroyed, and that the Surfer's board is a homing beacon leading Galactus to Earth.

Doom steals the board using a wrist-pad device he created in secret to gain control of the board and its powers, and escapes to China. The Fantastic Four rescue the Surfer, and pursue Doom in the Fantasticar, confronting him in Shanghai. With the Surfer powerless, Johnny absorbs the combined powers of the team to battle Doom, disabling Doom's device, while Ben Grimm uses a nearby crane to knock Doom into the harbor. 

Galactus has already arrived, and the Surfer regains the control of his board, flying into Galactus with help from Johnny. The conflict results in a massive blast of energy, engulfing Galactus in a cosmic rift, seemingly destroying them both. Johnny's second exposure to the Surfer heals him, and he can no longer switch his powers with his teammates.

Shortly after the events in Shanghai, Reed and Susan get married in Japan, only to be interrupted yet again by an alert that Venice is sinking into the sea; to Reed's delight, Sue has the wedding finish quickly before they race off to save the city.

In a mid-credits scene, the seemingly lifeless Silver Surfer floats through space, until his eyes open and his board races back to him.

Cast
 Ioan Gruffudd as Reed Richards / Mister Fantastic
 Jessica Alba as Susan "Sue" Storm-Richards / Invisible Woman
 Chris Evans as Johnny Storm / Human Torch
 Michael Chiklis as Ben Grimm / The Thing
 Julian McMahon as Dr. Victor Von Doom
 Kerry Washington as Alicia Masters
 Andre Braugher as General Hager
 Doug Jones as the Silver Surfer, Galactus' herald formerly known as Norrin Radd. Laurence Fishburne provides the voice of the Surfer.
 Beau Garrett as Captain Raye
 Brian Posehn as Wedding Minister
 Zach Grenier as Mr. Sherman / Rafke
 Vanessa Minnillo as Johnny's Wedding Date
 Stan Lee as Rejected Wedding Guest
 Dawn Chubai as Newscaster

Production

With Fantastic Four grossing $330 million worldwide, 20th Century Fox hired director Tim Story and screenwriter Mark Frost in December 2005 to return for the superhero team's sequel. Screenwriters Frost and Don Payne were hired to write the screenplay. Payne has said the film is based upon "The Galactus Trilogy", in which Galactus also makes an appearance, as well as issues 57–60 in which Doom steals the Surfer's power. Payne has also said the film takes inspiration from the Ultimate Marvel limited series Ultimate Extinction. As of March 2, 2007, Galactus' design was not yet done, and by April 18, until hiring Laurence Fishburne to perform the voice, the filmmakers were unsure of whether the character would speak. Doug Jones was chosen to physically portray the Surfer and supposedly was unaware that he was being dubbed over. Since then, both this film and Hellboy remain the only two films where he has been dubbed over in English.

The film includes the Fantasti-Car, a larger role for Kerry Washington's character Alicia Masters, and in June 2006, the Silver Surfer was announced to appear in the sequel as a "villain/hero". The Silver Surfer has been created by combining the performance of actor Doug Jones, a grey-silver suit designed by Jose Fernandez and created by FX shop Spectral Motion which has then been enhanced by a new computer-generated system designed by WETA.

The sequel, whose working title was Fantastic Four 2, was officially titled Fantastic Four: Rise of the Silver Surfer in August 2006 with filming beginning on August 28 in Vancouver and set for a release date of June 15, 2007. Michael Chiklis' prosthetics as The Thing were also redesigned to allow him to take it off in between takes and for better ventilation.

In August 2006, actor Andre Braugher dropped out of an ER supporting role to be cast in Rise of the Silver Surfer. Braugher was cast as General Hager, whom director Story described as "an old acquaintance of Reed Richards and one of the major additions to the movie". In September, Jones was confirmed to portray the Silver Surfer in addition to Julian McMahon reprising his role as Doctor Doom. The Baxter Building was also redesigned.

Release

Marketing
The teaser trailer was initially exclusively attached to Night at the Museum. It was released to the general public online on December 26, 2006 on the film's official website. The theatrical trailer was scheduled to appear during the film Disturbia on April 13, 2007 but errors occurred and Tim Story announced that it would be released with Spider-Man 3 on May 4, 2007. The theatrical trailer was finally released online on April 30, 2007 on Apple Trailer's website.
20th Century Fox launched an outdoor advertising campaign at the end of February. The cast also made an appearance at the Coca-Cola 600 Nextel Cup NASCAR race in Charlotte over Memorial Day weekend.

In late May 2007, 20th Century Fox struck a deal with the Franklin Mint to promote the movie by altering 40,000 U.S. quarters and releasing them into circulation. All of the altered quarters were minted in 2005 and honor the state of California as part of the 50 State Quarters program created by the U.S. Mint. The altered quarters feature the Silver Surfer on the reverse along with a URL to the movie's official website. Once the U.S. Mint became aware of the promotion, it notified the studio and the Franklin Mint that it was breaking the law by turning government-issued currency into private advertising. The federal mint did not indicate whether a penalty would be effected.

Home media
 
The film was released October 2, 2007 on DVD (Widescreen/Full Screen & 2 Disc "The Power Cosmic" Edition) and high-definition Blu-ray Disc.

Reception

Box office 
On its opening weekend, the film was the highest-grossing movie at the U.S. box office, reaching approximately $58 million, $2 million more than its predecessor. By its second weekend, the film suffered a 66% drop and a 54% drop in its third weekend. The film grossed $289 million worldwide, including a $131.9 million gross in the United States and in Canada. The budget was $120–130 million.

Critical response 
 

The website's critics consensus reads: "While an improvement on its predecessor, Fantastic Four: Rise of the Silver Surfer is nevertheless a juvenile, simplistic picture that has little benefit beyond its special effects." On Metacritic, the film has a weighted average score of 45 out of 100, based on 33 critics, indicating "mixed or average reviews". Audiences polled by CinemaScore gave the film an average grade of "B" on an A+ to F scale.

The New York Times critic Manohla Dargis called the film an "amalgam of recycled ideas, dead air, dumb quips, casual sexism and pseudoscientific mumbo jumbo". 
Joe Morgenstern of The Wall Street Journal said the film was "more fun than in the original" but "fails to sustain its modest running time of 87 minutes." 
James Berardinelli of ReelViews.com called the film "so lackluster it makes Spider-Man 3 feel like a masterpiece by comparison".

Kevin Maher of The Times liked the film's light tone saying "the film is everything you’d expect from a movie that began in the pages of a 1960s comic book – garish, giddy, emotionally simplistic, boldly idiotic and mercifully short". 
New York Daily News liked the movie: "It's almost a surprise that the sequel is actually better — much better — than the original."

Accolades
Rise of the Silver Surfer was nominated for fifteen awards, winning two. The film won the 2008 Golden Trailer Award for "Best Teaser Poster", against competition from Saw IV, and Quantum of Solace, among others. At the 2008 Kids' Choice Awards, Jessica Alba won for "Favorite Female Movie Star", over Keira Knightley of Pirates of the Caribbean: At World's End, and Kirsten Dunst of Spider-Man 3. Rise of the Silver Surfer was nominated for five additional Kids' Choice awards.

Fantastic Four: Rise of the Silver Surfer lost to Cloverfield for the Academy of Science Fiction, Fantasy, and Horror Films' 2008 Best Science Fiction Film award, just as it lost in the "Best Summer Movie You Haven't Seen Yet" category, presented by the MTV Movie Awards to Transformers. The United Kingdom's National Movie Awards, additionally, selected Harry Potter and the Order of the Phoenix over Rise of the Silver Surfer in its 2007 "Best Family" category. The film was nominated in eight categories during the Teen Choice Awards ceremonies of 2007, but won no award.

See also
 Fantastic Four in film
 Fantastic Four: Rise of the Silver Surfer (video game)

Notes

References

 
 Superhero Hype: FF
 F4Moviearacde.com
 Fantastic Four: Rise of the Silver Surfer at Metacritic

External links 
 
 
 
 
 Fantastic Four: Rise of the Silver Surfer Production Notes

American science fiction action films
2007 science fiction action films
2000s superhero films
2007 films
2000s English-language films
English-language German films
20th Century Fox films
1492 Pictures films
Dune Entertainment films
Apocalyptic films
Depictions of Stan Lee on film
Films about scientists
Films about weddings
Films directed by Tim Story
Films produced by Avi Arad
Films produced by Bernd Eichinger
Films produced by Ralph Winter
Films scored by John Ottman
Films set in 2007
Films set in Egypt
Films set in Europe
Films set in Japan
Films set in London
Films set in New York City
Films set in Romania
Films set in Shanghai
Films set in Siberia
Films shot in Greenland
Films shot in Vancouver
Films with screenplays by Don Payne
Films with screenplays by Mark Frost
American sequel films
American superhero films
Silver Surfer
Rise of the Silver Surfer
Doctor Doom
2000s American films
Live-action films based on Marvel Comics
Films set in the Black Forest